Zemsky is a surname. Notable people with the surname include:

 Johann Zemsky, Knight's Cross of the Iron Cross recipient
Peter Zemsky, American-French academic
Robert Zemsky (born 1941), American academic

Surnames of European origin